The Thebes Bridge is a five span cantilever truss bridge carrying the Union Pacific Railroad (previously carried the Missouri Pacific and Southern Pacific, in a joint operation) across the Mississippi River between Illmo, Missouri and Thebes, Illinois. It is owned by the Southern Illinois and Missouri Bridge Company, now a Union Pacific subsidiary.

History
It was initially owned equally by the Chicago and Eastern Illinois Railroad, Illinois Central Railroad, Missouri Pacific Railway, St. Louis, Iron Mountain and Southern Railway, and St. Louis Southwestern Railway.

Following approval of the bridge plans in 1902, limited construction activities began that year.  Following litigation over right of way that prevented certain work from proceeding from May 1902 to April 1903, construction continued with the concrete arch approach structures in 1903, and the bridge superstructure itself in 1904.  The legal issues "delayed considerably" the completion of the Missouri approach work, one of the main river piers, and led to an increased expense in constructing the superstructure. The bridge was dedicated in May 1905.

The designer of the bridge was Polish-American engineer Ralph Modjeski.  Contractors included C. Macdonald & Co. of New York, J.S. Paterson Construction Company of Chicago, MacArthur Brothers of Chicago, and American Bridge Company of New York.  The American Bridge Company in turn subcontracted the superstructure's erection to Kelley-Atkinson Construction Co of Chicago.

The Missouri Pacific and SLIM&S merged in 1917, and in 1945 the C&EI sold its 1/5 share to the Missouri Pacific, giving the latter company, since merged into the UP, a majority interest.

See also

List of crossings of the Upper Mississippi River

References

Further reading

Moody's Steam Railroads 1949 by John Moody of Moody's Investor Service

Truss bridges in the United States
Railroad bridges in Missouri
Railroad bridges in Illinois
Bridges over the Mississippi River
Bridges completed in 1905
Union Pacific Railroad bridges
Chicago and Eastern Illinois Railroad
Illinois Central Railroad
Missouri Pacific Railroad
St. Louis Southwestern Railway
Buildings and structures in Scott County, Missouri
1905 establishments in Illinois
1905 establishments in Missouri
Interstate vehicle bridges in the United States
Transportation in Scott County, Missouri
Transportation in Alexander County, Illinois
Buildings and structures in Alexander County, Illinois